Randy T. Heath (born November 11, 1964, in Vancouver, British Columbia) is a retired National Hockey League player, who played for the New York Rangers. He played a total of thirteen games and scored two goals and four assists for six points.

Awards
 WHL First All-Star Team – 1983
 WHL West First All-Star Team – 1984

External links
 

1964 births
Canadian expatriate ice hockey players in Sweden
Canadian ice hockey forwards
Living people
New Haven Nighthawks players
New York Rangers draft picks
New York Rangers players
Portland Winterhawks players
Skellefteå AIK players
Ice hockey people from Vancouver
Vancouver Bluehawks players
VIK Västerås HK players